Leucine zipper-EF-hand containing transmembrane protein 1 is a protein that in humans is encoded by the LETM1 gene.

Structure 

The LETM1 protein has a transmembrane domain and a casein kinase 2 and protein kinase C phosphorylation site.  The LETM1 gene is expressed in the mitochondria of many eukaryotes indicating that this is a conserved mitochondrial protein.

Function 

LETM1 is a eukaryotic protein that is expressed in the inner membrane of mitochondria. Experiments performed with human cells have been interpreted to indicate that it functions as a component of a Ca2+/H+ antiporter. Experimental results with yeast cells have been interpreted as suggesting that LETM1 functions as a component of a K+/H+ antiporter. The Drosophila melanogaster LETM1 protein has been shown to functionally substitute for the K+/H+ antiporter function in yeast cells.

Clinical significance 

Deletion of LETM1 is thought to be involved in the development of Wolf–Hirschhorn syndrome in humans.

See also 
 LETM1-like protein family

References

Further reading 

 
 
 
 
 
 
 
 
 
 
 
 
 

Transport proteins
Mitochondrial proteins